Filin (meaning eagle-owl) is a gender-neutral Russian surname that may refer 
 Ivan Filin (born 1926), Soviet marathon runner
Oleksandr Filin (born 1996), Ukrainian football defender 
 Sergei Filin (born 1970), Russian ballet dancer and artistic director

Russian-language surnames